Henllan was a railway station near the village of Henllan, Ceredigion, West Wales, serving the hamlet and the rural locale.

History

The Teifi Valley Railway was originally operated by the Carmarthen and Cardigan Railway between Carmarthen and Cynwyl Elfed. In 1864, the line was extended to Pencader and Llandysul. The line was purchased by the Great Western Railway (GWR) and extended to a terminus at Newcastle Emlyn in 1895. The GWR did not build the line on to Cardigan and Newcastle Emlyn remained the terminus. Henllan station had a goods yard with cattle pens, a passing loop and two platforms.

Although passenger services ceased in 1952, goods services continued until 1973 because of the milk train services to the Co-operative Group creamery at Newcastle Emlyn.

The Teifi Valley Railway (TVR)
A group of railway enthusiasts bought the old trackbed at Henllan and, in 1983, laid a  gauge track. The Teifi Valley Railway line originally ran from Henllan to Pontprenshitw, however in 1987 the line was extended as far as Llandyfriog and, since 2006, has been further extended to the current end of the line, known as Llandyfriog Riverside. In 2009, work proceeded to return the location of Henllan station to its original site and the platform was opened again to passenger use in July 2009.

Notes

References
 
 Holden, John S. Holden (2007). The Manchester & Milford Railway. The Oakwood Press. .

External links
Henllan Station

Former Great Western Railway stations
Railway stations in Great Britain opened in 1895
Railway stations in Great Britain closed in 1952
Disused railway stations in Carmarthenshire
Heritage railway stations in Carmarthenshire